is a Japanese four-panel manga series written and illustrated by Hiroyuki. It was serialized in Square Enix's seinen manga magazine Young Gangan from February 1, 2008 to September 21, 2012 and the chapters collected into 10 tankōbon volumes. A sequel titled The Comic Artist and His Assistants 2 was serialized from August 2, 2013 to June 6, 2014. An anime television series adaptation animated by Zexcs aired between April 7, 2014 and June 23, 2014.

Plot
Manga author Yūki Aito is an incredibly perverted man whose main loves and desires is to love everyone close to him and draw panties. His assistant, Ashisu, is constantly put into awkward situations and is forced to cope with Aito's shenanigans.

Characters

Main characters

 (anime), Jun Fukuyama (drama CD)
Yūki is the manga artist of the currently serialized "Hajiratte Cafe Latte" (HajiCafe). He is mostly viewed as perverted by many and does not hesitate to tell his interest or asking his assistants to be his model for reference. Yūki has an uncontrollable fetish for women's undergarments, specifically panties, even so that his main philosophy and theme of his manga revolves around panties, much to the chagrin of others. Yūki has the habit of doing his manga work at the last minute before fixed deadlines due to engaging in his interests, much to his editor's distress. Yūki's goal in life is to be confessed to by a girl before he dies. Yūki is said to be a very skilled manga artist, who could rank much better if he truly wanted, but his interest in drawing panties as his priority gives him only a decent ranking at best. He is 22 years old and happens to be a major masochist.

 (anime), Mamiko Noto (drama CD)
Sahoto is Yūki's 19-year-old assistant. Sahoto is described as serious on her work ethic yet very down-to-earth. She is often the target of Yūki's mischief, much to her chagrin, and doesn't hesitate to lash out at him. Albeit as a manga artist assistant, Sahoto also aims to serialize a manga series of her own; however, her attempts in doing so were constantly rejected by editors. Although she is more often than not annoyed by Yūki's antics, she deeply respects him as a manga artist.

 (anime), Haruka Tomatsu (drama CD)
Mihari is Yūki's editor. Mihari is usually violent around Yūki, often scolding and beating him for his shortcomings. She is conscious of her small breast size and thus has a breast complex. She and Yūki were once classmates and is noted to have a liking for the latter at the time. Despite constantly berating Yūki for his irresponsible or otherwise perverted behavior, she's been shown to be quite tolerant on his deadlines, and she constantly encourages him to do better, knowing he is more than capable of doing so. She denies it, but it is hinted that she has not completely gotten over the enormous crush on Yūki she has had forever from high school.

 (anime), Aki Toyosaki (drama CD)
Rinna is one of Yūki's assistants. Despite being an assistant, Rinna knows nothing about drawing manga, as she was hired by Mihari due to Yūki wanting someone who is cute. Rinna greatly admires Yūki and his work, being one of his fans. She is easy going and is generally cheerful, playing along with Yūki's weird perverted ideas. Rinna is 18 years old.

 (anime, drama CD)
Sena is a recurring assistant of Yūki. Sena is known by the manga industry as a hardworking and reliable assistant. Due to her small, childish stature, Sena is usually mistaken as a child and, at times, acts like one, especially when she is drunk. At first, she is shown to have weak strength, being unable to even open an ink pot, causing her to leave many manga artists out of pure embarrassment, which was rumored to be because the manga artists had offended her. She later develops feelings for Yūki. Sena is 19 years old and happens to be a major sadist.

Branya is Yūki's pet cat and mascot character. It can draw very well, and has been the subject of jealousy from Ashisu, who notes that it can draw better than her despite being a cat.

Monthly Shōnen Gongon manga artist team

 (drama CD)
Kazuma is the manga artist of the currently serialized "Hot Blooded (Fire) Fighter". His manga's popularity is 14th out of 20 works in Gongon Comics.

 (drama CD)
Meisei is the manga artist of Gongon Comics' second most popular manga "J.O.D (Judgement of Darkness)". He has a habit of looking down on others.

Ichika is the manga artist of Gongon Comics' most popular manga "Adventure World". She is almost 30 years old but has never been in love before because she has spent most of her time on manga.

Tamako is the manga artist of Gongon Comics' new manga "Tension 1000%". She speaks like a cat and is a very energetic girl.

Monthly Shōnen Gongon editing department

 (anime)
Matome is the chief editor of Monthly Shōnen Gongon. Despite her position, people sometimes get confused about her identity due to her young age and small stature. 

 (anime)
Kouken is the assistant chief editor of Monthly Shōnen Gongon. He is Meisei's older brother and his editor.

Aoi is a new editor of Monthly Shōnen Gongon. He looks like a girl.

Others

 (anime)
Sahono is Sahoto's 13-year-old little sister.

Manabi is Yūki's 14-year-old student. She is a middle school student who wants to become a manga artist.

Sasae is Ichika Konno's chief assistant and manager.

Mamori is Yūki's apartment manager.

Mirei is Mamori's older sister.

Rinna's father visits Yūki and tries to make Rinna to quit as Yūki's assistant.

Jun is Ashisu's first assistant after Ashisu successfully becomes a manga artist. She is introduced in the manga The Comic Artist and His Assistants 2.

A mascot character created by Yūki.

Media

Manga
The Comic Artist and His Assistants was serialized in Square Enix's seinen manga magazine Young Gangan from February 1, 2008 to September 21, 2012. It was compiled in 10 volumes released between October 27, 2008 and December 25, 2012. A sequel titled The Comic Artist and His Assistants 2 was serialized from August 2013 to September 2014. It was compiled in 1 volume on June 25, 2014.

Drama CD
A drama CD of The Comic Artist and His Assistants has been released on January 26, 2011.

Anime
An anime television series adaptation animated by Zexcs aired from April 7 to June 23, 2014. Crunchyroll hosted a simultaneously released English subtitled version. Shortly after, Sentai Filmworks licensed the series for digital and physical release in North America. The series was released in Japan on 6 Blu-ray and DVD discs at a rate of one per month from June to November 2014.The series upcomingly was released in Mexico after Yowu Entertainment fired the show and being released by Televisa airing on three channels bitMe, the gaming channel, Golden Premier, The premium movie channel and Telehit, the music channel, and web airings on Blim The mexican VOD subscription free-on-demand service as well as Canal 11 in Costa Rica, ETC in Chile, America TV in Peru, La Tele in Paraguay and Canal Uno in Colombia. Mini OVAs were included with each volume of the Blu-ray/DVD packages. Sentai released the series on subtitled-only Blu-ray and DVD on September 15, 2015. The opening song titled  and ending song titled "Spica" are both sung by idol group StylipS. The Show was dubbed in French and aired on two channels Gong and Nolife, and the show until Nolife ceased operations Game One continued to air the show as well.

Episode list

References

External links
 Manga official website 
 The Comic Artist and His Assistants 2 manga official website 
 Official website 
 

2008 manga
2013 manga
2014 anime OVAs
2014 anime television series debuts
Anime series based on manga
Comedy anime and manga
Gangan Comics manga
Seinen manga
Sentai Filmworks
Slice of life anime and manga
Square Enix franchises
Yonkoma
Zexcs
Manga creation in anime and manga